Rebecca Hart (born October 26, 1984) is a para-equestrian from Pittsburgh, Pennsylvania. Hart was born with a rare genetic disease, Familial spastic paraplegia (FSP). FSP affected Hart as a child with difficulty gaining strength in her upper body as well as slowing down her motor development.

At the age of 10, Rebecca began horseback riding. Just a few years later after attending the Paralympic movement in 1998 at a regional competition in Atlanta, Georgia, Hart realized that she would like to train for competition. That same year, 1998, Hart purchased her first horse.

Hart has been the United States Equestrian Federation (USEF) National Para-Equestrian Champion six times; 2006, 2008, 2009, 2010, 2012, and 2014. Hart made her first appearance at the Beijing Paralympics in 2008, competing with her horse Norteassa. She would go on to claim 4th place in freestyle at her first games.

She would go on to compete with Norteassa at the World Equestrian Games (WEG) in Lexington, KY, which would be her last competition with Norteassa. After Norteassa's retirement, she went on to ride Missy Ransehousen's Lord Ludger for the 2012 season. The 2012 season was a very successful one for Rebecca and ‘LoLu’, winning the Wellington Sunshine Classic CPEDI3* along with the 2012 National Para-Equestrian Championships. Winning these competitions is what named Rebecca and LoLu as members of the 2012 United States Paralympic Team, as well as naming Rebecca Team Captain. Rebecca went on to score the highest among all other U.S. team members at the 2012 London Paralympics.

Schroeter's Romani was purchased for Rebecca at the end of 2014. Together they were named the National Champions in 2014, along with being named to the 2014 World Equestrian Games in Normandy, France. Soon after Rebecca won the 2015 Global/Adequan CPEDI3* in Florida.

Personal life 
Hart was born in Pittsburgh on October 26, 1984. She is 5' 5" and weighs 123 lbs. She attended Villa Maria Academy High School in Erie, PA and graduated in 2003. Her college was Pennsylvania State University, from which she graduated in 2009 with a degree in business.

Paralympic career  
Hart has a Grade II classification in Paralympic sport and has competed in both individual and team dressage events.
 Three-Time Paralympian: 2008, 2012, 2016
 Rio 2016 Paralympic Games, 9th individual championship, 7th freestyle, 5th team dressage, 12th Championship
 London 2012 Paralympic Games, 5th freestyle, 7th team dressage, 11th Championship
 Beijing 2008 Paralympic Games, 4th freestyle, 10th team dressage, 12th Championship
 2015 Team Gold medalist with Schroeters Romani at the Global Dressage Festival CPEDI3* and Grade II Individual Champion with Schroeters Romani
 Placed second in the 2015 Grade II Team Test and Individual Team Test with Schroeters Romani at the Uberherrn, Germany CPEDI3*
 Won the 2015 Grade II Team Test with Schroeters Romani at the Hartpury, UK CPEDI3*

Grants awarded 
 2015 Travel & Training Fund Grant Recipient from The Women's Sports Foundation

References

Sportspeople from Pittsburgh
Sportswomen with disabilities
American female equestrians
Smeal College of Business alumni
1984 births
Living people
21st-century American women